The Asterigerinacea (or Asterigerinoidea) is a superfamily of Foraminifera included in the order Rotaliida, proposed by Loeblich and Tappan in 1988. 
 
The Asterigerinacea unites three families, the Episomariidae and Asterigerinidae which had been included in the Discorbacea and the Amphisteginidae which was included in the Orbiotoidacea in the Treatise on Invertebrate Paleontology, Part C.

Asterigerinacea are characterized by a trochospiral or nearly planispiral arrangement of the chambers, which are fully or partially subdivided by internal partitions. The primary aperture is commonly on the interior margin and secondary apertures are commonly along the sutures. Apertures may also form on the chamber surfaces as well. Test walls are composed of optically radial calcite.

The Asterigerinacea range from the Cretaceous to Recent, the oldest family being the Asterigerinidae.

References

Foraminifera superfamilies
Rotaliida